Dromiskin Monastery is a medieval monastery and National Monument located in Dromiskin, County Louth in Ireland.

Location

History

The monastery at Dromiskin is said to have been founded by Lugaid (d. 515/516), a follower of Saint Patrick and son of Óengus mac Nad Froích, King of Munster, in the 6th century; or by Rónán, son of Bearach in the 7th century. Rónán died in 664 of buide-connaill ("yellow plague," an epidemic illness in ancient Ireland).

The round tower was constructed in the 9th century. Dromiskin was burned by Vikings in 833 (Annals of Ulster). The Uí Chrítáin were hereditary clergy at Dromiskin and it was pillaged by Domnall ua Néill in 970. The monastery was plundered by Irish in 908, Vikings in 978 and Irish again in 1043. It continued in operation until the 12th century.

Buildings

Round tower

The upper portion was rebuilt around the 12th century and used as a bell tower, and remained in use until the 19th century.

High cross

The arms of a high cross (10th century AD) are mounted on a modern shaft (1918). Some accounts associate it with Áed Findliath (High King of Ireland 862–879). One panel is believed to show David presenting Goliath's head to Saul. Also carved on it are dragons and a crucifixion.

Church
The gable and foundation of a 12th century church with 15th century window remain at Dromiskin.

See also
List of abbeys and priories in Ireland (County Louth)

References

External links

Christian monasteries in the Republic of Ireland
Religion in County Louth
Archaeological sites in County Louth
National Monuments in County Louth